Enteromius aspilus is a species of ray-finned fish in the genus Enteromius.

Footnotes

References

Endemic fauna of Cameroon
Enteromius
Taxa named by George Albert Boulenger
Fish described in 1907